The Zombies are a British rock band formed in the early 1960s in St Albans and led by keyboardist and vocalist Rod Argent and vocalist Colin Blunstone. The group had a British and American hit in 1964 with "She's Not There". In the US, two further singles—"Tell Her No" in 1965 and "Time of the Season" in 1969—were also successful. Their 1968 album Odessey and Oracle was ranked number 100 on Rolling Stones 2012 list of the 500 Greatest Albums of All Time, and number 243 on Rolling Stone's 2020 list. The Zombies were inducted into the Rock and Roll Hall of Fame in 2019.

History

1961–1964
Three members of the band, Rod Argent, Paul Atkinson and Hugh Grundy, first came together to jam in 1961 in St Albans, Hertfordshire. Argent wanted to form a band and initially asked his elder cousin Jim Rodford to join as a bassist. Rodford was in a successful local band, the Bluetones, at the time and so declined, but he offered to help Argent (Rodford would later join in 2004 when the band reformed). Colin Blunstone and Paul Arnold joined the other three to form the band in April 1962, while all five members were at school.

Some sources state that Argent, Atkinson, and Grundy were at St Albans School, while Blunstone and Arnold were students at St Albans Boys' Grammar School (since renamed Verulam School). However, both Blunstone and Grundy came from Hatfield and both sang in the choir there at St Etheldreda's Church. Argent was a boy chorister in St Albans Cathedral Choir. They held their original rehearsals at the Pioneer Club, then situated on Hatfield Road, using equipment lent to them by the Bluetones. They met outside the Blacksmiths Arms pub in St Albans before their first rehearsal and gained their initial reputation playing the Old Verulamians Rugby Club there.

Their original name was the Mustangs, but they quickly realised that there were other groups with that name. It was Arnold who came up with the Zombies, according to Blunstone. When Argent was asked about the origins of the band's name in a 2015 interview with PopMatters journalist J.C. Maçek III, Argent said, "Well, we chose that name in 1961 and, I mean, I knew vaguely that they were: sort of, you know, the Walking Dead from Haiti and Colin didn't even really know what they were." Argent explains, "It was [original bass guitarist] Paul [Arnold] that came up with the name. I don't know where he got it from. He very soon left the band after that." However, Arnold also left his mark with the name. "I thought this was a name that no one else is going to have. And I just liked the whole idea of it. Colin was wary, I'm sure, at the beginning, I know, but I always, always really, really liked it."

Arnold lost interest in the band and chose to leave to become a physician; he was replaced by Chris White. After winning a beat-group competition sponsored by the London Evening News, they signed a recording contract with Decca and recorded their first hit, "She's Not There". It was released in mid-1964 and peaked at number 12 in the UK, becoming their only UK Top 40 hit. The tune began to catch on in the United States and eventually climbed to number 2 in early December. It sold over one million copies, and was awarded a gold disc by the RIAA.

1965–1968
Like many other British groups, the Zombies travelled to the United States to tour on the momentum of their hit single. Among their early US gigs were Murray the K's Christmas shows at the Brooklyn Fox Theatre, where the band played seven performances a day. On 12 January 1965 the band made their first in-person appearance on US television on the first episode of NBC's Hullabaloo and played "She's Not There" and their new single "Tell Her No" to a screaming, hysterical audience full of teenage girls.

In the UK, the Zombies' follow-up single to "She's Not There" was written by Chris White.  "Leave Me Be" was unsuccessful in the UK and as a result was not issued as an A-side in the US.  It did appear as the B side of their second US single, "Tell Her No". Penned by Rod Argent, "Tell Her No" became another big seller in 1965, peaking at No.6 on the Billboard Hot 100 in March. As the band's third UK single, "Tell Her No" failed to make the Top 40, peaking at number 42. Subsequent recordings such as "She's Coming Home", "Whenever You're Ready", "Is This the Dream", "Indication" and "Gotta Get a Hold of Myself" failed to achieve the success of the previous two singles (although the Zombies had continued success in Scandinavia and the Philippines, which led to a series of concerts in 1967). A song by the Zombies released only as a B-side (to "Whenever You're Ready") in both the US and UK in 1965, "I Love You" subsequently became a sizeable hit for the group People! in the United States in 1968.

The Zombies' first UK album, Begin Here (1965) was a mixture of original songs and rhythm and blues cover versions. Of the eight original tracks, Rod Argent supplied the album's biggest hit, "She's Not There", and the songs "Woman", "I Remember When I Loved Her", plus "The Way I Feel Inside" which was the shortest track on the album at 1:28. It might have been shorter, had not their recording manager and producer Ken Jones added the sounds of footsteps and a coin dropping, which contributed to the feeling of alienation that the song projected. Bassist Chris White provided "I Can't Make Up My Mind", the quirky "I Don't Want to Know", plus the beaty "What More Can I Do" which, at 1:38, is the second-shortest cut on the album and contains a simple but distinctive drum riff.  The final original was an instrumental written by Ken Jones, "Work 'n' Play".

The Zombies continued recording original songs through 1965 and 1966, trying to achieve chart success.  There were enough tracks to have filled a follow-up album, but due to the band's lack of chart success, most of these tracks remained unissued at the time.

In 1967, frustrated by their continuing lack of success, the Zombies signed a recording contract with CBS Records for whom they recorded the album Odessey and Oracle at EMI's world-famous Abbey Road studios. (Odyssey was accidentally misspelled by Terry Quirk, an art teacher who designed the cover). The band's budget did not stretch to session musicians, so they used a Mellotron to fill out their arrangements.  According to Argent, they used John Lennon's Mellotron, which had been left in the studio after the Beatles' sessions for Sgt. Pepper's Lonely Hearts Club Band. The album was mixed into the standard mono; however as another concession toward their limited budget, Argent and White (who, due to their songwriting royalties, had earned more than the rest of the members) personally paid for stereo mixes.

The change in direction was evident on their first single released by CBS, "Care of Cell 44", a song about the anticipation felt while waiting for the singer's partner to be released from prison.  It is also notable for the title of the song not appearing anywhere in the lyrics.  Unfortunately, like their previous Decca releases, it failed to reach the charts. A second CBS single, "Friends of Mine", was also unsuccessful.  With the band experiencing a declining demand for live appearances, they split up after a final gig in mid-December 1967.  Odessey and Oracle, the band's swansong, was released in April 1968 and sold poorly. It was only given a US release because musician Al Kooper, then signed to Columbia Records, convinced his label of the album's merits. One of its tracks, "Time of the Season", written by Argent, was released as a single in 1968 and spent a long period as a 'sleeper'. Eventually, in 1969, it grew to become a nationwide hit in the US, peaking in the Hot 100 (Billboard) at No.3.

In 1968, Argent and White began working on material for a possible new band when they were approached by CBS to do another Zombies album. Several new tracks were cut with a line-up of Argent, Hugh Grundy, Rodford (bass) and Rick Birkett (guitar), and were combined with some old Decca out-takes and demos that were overdubbed and enhanced in sessions at Morgan Studios in London. The album, scheduled for release in 1969, was cancelled and only a couple of the songs, "Imagine the Swan" (one of the newly recorded songs) and "If It Don't Work Out" (a demo of a song that Dusty Springfield recorded and released in 1965), were put out as singles instead. (Some of this material was released on various compilation albums during the 1970s and 1980s, and the album, titled R.I.P., was finally released in Japan in 2000).

Post–Zombies (1969–1988) 
The original line-up declined to regroup for concerts following the belated American success of "Time of the Season". In turn, various concocted bands tried to capitalize on the success and falsely toured under the band's name. In a scheme organized by Delta Promotions, an agency that also created fake touring versions of The Animals and The Archies, two fake Zombie line-ups were touring simultaneously in 1969, one hailing from Texas, the other from Michigan. The Texas group featured bassist Dusty Hill and drummer Frank Beard, soon to be members of ZZ Top. Another group toured in 1988, going so far as to not only trademark the group's name (the real band had let it lapse) but also recruit a bass guitarist named Ronald Hugh Grundy, claiming that original drummer Hugh Grundy had switched instruments.

In 1969, Rod Argent formed the band called Argent with White as a non-performing songwriter. Atkinson worked in A&R at Columbia and Grundy joined him there after a brief spell in auto sales. Blunstone started a solo career after a brief period outside the music business, including working in the burglary claims section of the Sun Alliance insurance company. Both Argent and White provided him with new songs. He also did studio vocals for the Alan Parsons Project. Atkinson retired as a performer and worked as an A&R executive for many years.

1989–1999
In 1989, Blunstone, White and Grundy briefly reunited as the Zombies with guitarist/keyboardist Sebastian Santa Maria and recorded the album The Return of the Zombies (February 1990), featuring some tracks that were remixed or re-recorded that appeared alongside some new songs the following year on New World (April 1991).

A 1997, 120-track compilation of the original band's work, Zombie Heaven, was released on UK Ace/Big beat. The compilation contains all the band's Decca/Parrot recordings (in mono), the entire Odessey And Oracle LP (in stereo), the material that would have made up the unissued R.I.P. LP, several unissued recordings and a disc of recordings made for the BBC. On 25 November 1997, all five Zombies reunited at the Jazz Café in London's Camden Town as part of a solo show by Blunstone to perform "She's Not There" and "Time of the Season" to promote the release of Zombie Heaven.

Blunstone and Argent did not play together again until late 1999. Argent spotted Blunstone in the audience while performing at a charity concert for jazz musician John Dankworth and invited him onstage for an impromptu reunion. This positive experience set the stage for further collaborations to come.

2000–present
The twosome reunited to play shows together in 2000 under the Colin Blunstone & Rod Argent moniker and moved to the U.S. in 2001. They recorded an album, Out of the Shadows (2001), and continued playing live shows together into 2004 when they began going out under the name "The Zombies" again. The new line-up included Keith Airey (brother of Don Airey) on guitar, Jim Rodford on bass, and his son Steve Rodford on drums.

In 2002, Ace/Big Beat released the 48-track The Decca Stereo Anthology, which, for the first time, mixed all the Decca/Parrot recordings into true stereo. An album of new material released in 2004, As Far as I Can See..., received poor-to-scathing reviews from both Pitchfork and AllMusic.

In January 2004, guitarist Paul Atkinson received the President's Merit Award from the National Academy of Recording Arts and Sciences at a benefit concert at the House of Blues in Los Angeles, California. The Zombies reunited for the event, which turned out to be Atkinson's last performance with them. He died later that year on 1 April 2004, in Santa Monica, California, from liver and kidney disease.

In 2005, Blunstone and Argent released a DVD and 2-CD album (Live at the Bloomsbury Theatre) and continued touring with the Zombies. To mark the 40th anniversary of Odessey and Oracle, the four surviving original members of the Zombies participated in a three-night series of concerts at London's Shepherd's Bush Empire Theatre between 7 and 9 March 2008. Blunstone and Argent's respective websites had advertised that the concert of 8 March was recorded for a CD and/or DVD release later in 2008, and the CD was officially posted by Amazon.com to be pre-sold for a release of 1 July 2008. Both CD and DVD were officially released in the UK and several other countries.

In 2006, Argent performed and toured with Ringo Starr as part of the All-Starr Band.  Argent performed the Zombies' songs "She's Not There" and "Time of the Season" as well as "Hold Your Head Up" from his other musical group, Argent.

In 2010, Ace Records released a series of six 7-inch vinyl EPs. All the tracks were new to vinyl, with some rarities taken from the Zombie Heaven box set, as well as previously unreleased material. Tom Toomey replaced Airey on guitar. In 2011, "The Zombies featuring Colin Blunstone & Rod Argent" released their new studio album Breathe Out, Breathe In. Reviews were generally strong, and included 4-star reviews from publications including Record Collector, Q, Uncut, the Daily Mirror and The Independent. The band set out to tour annually in the UK, US, Canada and Netherlands. The 2011 tour included Japan, France, Germany, Greece and Israel.

In 2012, band members participated in the unveiling of a commemorative plaque at the Blacksmith's Arms, a St Albans pub where the Zombies met for their first rehearsal.

On 19 July 2013, it was announced that the band would be appearing on the second annual Moody Blues Cruise, 2–7 April 2014 on the cruise ship MSC Ship Divina. On 16 October 2013, the Zombies were announced as nominees for inclusion to the Rock and Roll Hall of Fame, the first nomination for the band since coming into eligibility in 1990. The Zombies were nominated again for the Hall in 2016.

In 2014, the Zombies performed in festival circuits including the Austin Psych Festival and San Francisco Stern Grove Festival. The next year, the band announced they would embark on a 2015 American tour of the Odessey and Oracle album with White and Grundy returning.

The Zombies' sixth album, Still Got That Hunger, produced by Chris Potter, was announced for a release date of 9 October 2015. The album's recording was successfully funded by crowdfunding service PledgeMusic during August 2014. The Zombies toured the US in the autumn of 2015 to promote Still Got That Hunger and were again joined by surviving former members White and Grundy, along with keyboardist Darian Sahanaja and White's wife Viv Boucherat (on backing vocals) to play the entire Odessey & Oracle album. On 30 October 2015, the Zombies made a guest appearance on The Late Show with Stephen Colbert.

In 2017, the four surviving original members (Colin Blunstone, Rod Argent, Chris White and Hugh Grundy) re-united for a North American tour marking the 50th anniversary of the recording of Odessey and Oracle. The first stop on this tour was a first-time performance in Jamaica, as the featured artist on the Flower Power Cruise on the Celebrity Summit while in port in Falmouth. A popular podcast, S-Town, used "A Rose for Emily" as its closing music. This exposure helped The Zombies land a guest appearance on Conan in May 2017. The band was nominated for induction into the Rock and Roll Hall of Fame in October 2017. They were nominated again a year later and were announced as one of seven inductees for the 2019 class in December 2018.

Jim Rodford died after a fall on 20 January 2018, aged 76. He was replaced by Søren Koch (from the Danish band The Beatophonics).

The band were inducted into the Rock and Roll Hall of Fame in 2019. That year, the three-day outdoor festival "Woodstock 50" was announced, to observe the 50th anniversary of the August 1969 Woodstock festival, at a Watkins Glen, New York auto speedway, with the Zombies as a featured act; however the festival was cancelled due to financial backers withdrawing.

In May 2019, The Zombies announced a co-headlining tour with Brian Wilson and Al Jardine of The Beach Boys called "Something Great From ’68’" featuring The Zombies performing Odessey and Oracle, in addition to other greatest hits. This tour would also feature the four surviving original members (Colin Blunstone, Rod Argent, Chris White and Hugh Grundy) in addition to the band's current line-up.

In late 2021, the band announced that they would be undertaking extensive tours of Britain, the US, Canada, and Europe, between February and September 2022.  However, in January 2022 it was announced that the UK part of the tour would be postponed until 2023.

Members
Members of the classic lineup are listed in bold.

Current 
Rod Argent – keyboards, backing and lead vocals (1961–1967, 1968, 1989, 1997, 2001–present)
Colin Blunstone – lead and backing vocals (1962–1967, 1989–1991, 1997, 2001–present), guitar (1962)
 Steve Rodford – drums, percussion (2001–present)
 Tom Toomey – guitar, backing vocals (2010–present)
 Søren Koch – bass guitar, backing vocals (2018–present)

Occasional 

 Hugh Grundy – drums, percussion, occasional backing vocals (1961–1967, 1968, 1989–1991, 1997; tour guest at select shows (often including Odessey and Oracle), 2007, 2015, 2017–present)
 Chris White – bass guitar, backing and lead vocals (1962–1967, 1989–1991, 1997; tour guest at select shows (often including Odessey and Oracle), 2007, 2015, 2017–present)
 Darian Sahanaja – keyboards, backing vocals (2007, 2015, 2017–present; since 2018, only appears at concerts where Odessey and Oracle is played)

Former 
 Paul Atkinson – guitar, occasional backing vocals (1961–1967, 1989, 1997, 2004; died 2004)
 Mark Johns – guitar (2001–2004)
 Keith Airey – guitar, backing vocals (2004–2010)
 Sebastian Santa Maria – keyboards, guitar, backing vocals (1989–1991; died 1996)
 Paul Arnold – bass guitar (1962)
 Jim Rodford – bass guitar, backing vocals (1968, 2001–2018; died 2018)

Timeline

Discography

1960s recordings

Studio albums
Begin Here (UK) / The Zombies (US) (1965)
Odessey and Oracle (1968)
R.I.P. (2000, recorded in 1968)

EPs
The Zombies (1964)

Live albums
Live at the BBC (2003)

Compilation albums
I Love You (1965) (released by Decca in the Netherlands and Japan)
 Early Days (1969) (Collection of their early singles; of the 12 tracks, only two appeared on LPs)
 The World of the Zombies (1970)
The Beginning (1973) (Vol 9 of "The Beginning" series on Decca, a selection from Early Days and The Zombies)
 Time of the Zombies (1973) (Contains hit singles, complete "Odessey & Oracle" LP and tracks from their unreleased LP)
Rock Roots (1976) LP on Decca
 She's Not There (1981) (LP on Decca)
 The Best and the Rest of the Zombies (1984) (8-song record on Back-Trac/CBS Special Products)
 The Zombies (1984) (22 track LP on See for Miles)
The Zombies: The Collection (1988)  Castle Communications
 Meet the Zombies (1988) (LP on Razor)
 Greatest Hits (1990) (CD/Cassette on DCC Compact Classics)
Zombie Heaven (1997) (4CD compilation with rarities and live recordings)
Absolutely the Best (1999)
Decca Stereo Anthology (2002)
The Singles: A's and B's (2005)
The Ultimate Zombies (2007)
Into the Afterlife (2007) (Compilation of recordings in between The Zombies and the member's solo careers. Features a few Zombies songs.)
Zombies & Beyond (2008) UK #43 (Features some Zombies songs and some solo songs)
Time of the Season (2017)

Contributions
Bunny Lake Is Missing – An Original Soundtrack Recording (1965) (contributed tracks)

Singles

1980s-present recordings

Studio albums
The Return of the Zombies (1990)/New World (1991)
Out of the Shadows (2001) (Credited to Colin Blunstone & Rod Argent)
As Far as I Can See... (2004)
Breathe Out, Breathe In (2011)
Still Got That Hunger (2015)
Different Game (2023)

Live albums 

 Live at the Bloomsbury Theatre, London (2005) (also on DVD)
On the BBC Radio (2007)
Odessey and Oracle: 40th Anniversary Live Concert (2008) (also on DVD)
Live in Concert at Metropolis Studios (2012)
Live in the UK (2013)

References

Other sources
 Guinness Rockopedia - 
 The Great Rock Discography - 5th Edition -

External links

 Official Zombies website
[ The Zombies biography at the AMG website]
Album of the living dead - Guardian interview
July 2008 interview with L.A. Record
3 November 2015 article and music, NPR Music

English rock music groups
Beat groups
British Invasion artists
Musical groups established in 1961
CBS Records artists
Decca Records artists
Parrot Records artists
Psychedelic pop music groups
Baroque pop musicians
Musical groups from St Albans
1961 establishments in England